The abbreviation ZTM means:

 Public Transport Authority (Warsaw) (in Polish: Zarząd Transportu Miejskiego w Warszawie), municipal transport authority in Warsaw, Poland
 Zbrojovka Vsetín, a Czech weapon factory
 the IATA code for Shamattawa Airport, Manitoba, Canada